Pimpingos District is one of fifteen districts of the Cutervo Province in the Cajamarca Region in Peru. It was created on 22 October 1910 by Law No. 1296. It is one of the oldest districts of the province.

Geography 
It is located approximately between 06°37′35″S and 06°44′50″S  and between 78°39′10″W and 78°46′50″W.

Location: northwest of the city of Cutervo
Population 6 196 inhabitants.
Capital: Pimpingos located at 1 720 m. Snm
Climate: Mild.
Area: Yunga, Quechua

Hunting 

Limits:

North: With Colasay Chora district and the province of Jaén.

East: In the districts of Toribio Casanova and St. Thomas.

South: In the districts of Santo Tomas and San Andrés.

West: In the district of Santa Cruz de Cutervo.

Economic Activities 
Crops: coffee, cassava, sugarcane, parsnips, rice, yellow corn, fruit trees and pastures.
Livestock: Cattle, pigs, horses, poultry. Their average milk / cow / day is 5.6 liters.
Agribusiness: Derived from sugarcane llonque, dairy products: cheese, cheese.

Population 
Pimping The district has a population of approximately 6 196 inhabitants by 2005, which has the following structure of the population, it reflects a larger composition that falls in children and young people.

Population 6 196 inhabitants (2006)
Density 33.3 hab./km2

Pimping is an area of 186.04 km2, representing 6.1% of the total Provincial. The population density is 41.66 inhabitants per km2. In the area of the department represents 0.56% of the total area.

Population density Pimping District, is below the density of the province and beyond departmental and national density

Pimping The District has 30 villages, of which 2 have the status of Minor Population Centers: Condorhuasi White House.

The Province Cutervo, representing 10.2% of the total population of Department of Cajamarca and Pimping represents 5.3% of the total population of the Province of Cutervo.

Cajamarca is the most rural department in the country, reaching a rate of 72%. It is also the third most populous department in the country, with a rate of 5.7%

History 
Building Official: Law No. 1296 October 22, 1910 became part of the province of Cutervo, dismembered Jaén.

Pimping The village also has a special place in the history of Peru by the Peruvian territory have been integrated using the international rights of Self-Determination of Peoples and utiposidetes in 1830.

Pimping The word is in the geographical map, drawn by the Spanish, assigned as the receipt of real lace Marañón River that has been made in the late 18th century to prevent the illicit removal of snuff Bracamoros that produced the Provinces Jaén and Chachapoyas, won by Don Alonso de Alvarado for the years of 1553.

The territory of present Pimping District, belonged to the Pre-Hispanic chiefdom Ethnicity and Huambo, which were conquered by the Inca and then by the Spanish invaders.

When Don José de San Martín reaches the Peru and proclaims independence, the peoples of Pimping and Choros join the cry for freedom in the city of Jaen Bracamoros, later Simón Bolívar, a patriotic cry merit of these peoples, the District amounts to class, not knowing the exact date of his political creation, belonging to the province Chota in 1857.

On October 22, 1910, Law No. 1290, establishing the Province Cutervo and the District of Pimping, becomes part of this Province.

In 1928, 14 May, Pimping is hit by an earthquake, a total of 41 dying people, moving the settlers to build homes in a place called "El Calvario", where they remained for a period of three years since then the tremors occurred frequently. When earthquakes stopped, the villagers returned to the place of origin to rebuild their homes.

Statistics 
Features of the Population Census 2005

Basic Services Housing Census 2005

Labor and Employment Indicators Census 1993

Farmhouses

Panama Farmhouse 
It is a community of 500 inhabitants. This is one of the villages with more development in recent years, as have services such as water, electricity transport and Education. Also has communal house, church, medical posts, schools No. 16420, Initial School, Central Square and secondary schools, although currently in a school building very modern noble material.

This institution, the National College "Mariano Melgar", was created on October 2, anniversary date, its promoter and first director was Professor Oswaldo Salazar Fernandez, who made possible the first high school this area, in this study people in different locations in the region.

There are also several projects such as drainage, park and tennis, making it one of the main villages of the province Cutervo.

His feast day is done on August 30 of each year devoted to Santa Rosa, where people come from different places, mostly cities delas Lima, Chicago and Jaén, in addition to other villages in that region as a winner, San Lorenzo, anise, Sacilia, El Cantor, Perlamayo, Santa Lucia, Choros, Pimping, San Pedro, El Rollo, Mesarrume, San Pablo, etc.; performed this dance, burning castles, a fair and sporting activities. In addition to selling an excellent cattle.

El Palto Farmhouse 
It is a community made up of a population of 450 inhabitants about youth organizations like the marching band "Santa Rosa de Lima", medical post, school, and other community organizations, struggling to get forward to the community.

It has passable road, which links communities Pucalá, New Alliance, Mirador, Condorhuasi, La Union, Pandalle. It is a very important way to transport their products agricultural to markets in the area.

His feast day held in honor of "Santa Rosa de Lima" on August 30 of each year. The celebration takes place through cultural, sporting, religious and social, which brings together all people from nearby communities and immigrants living in different Peru cities. It reminds one of the major characters Don Polidoro Fernández, great partner and manager of the community and other characters like Mr. Juan Rafael, Second Silva, Flavio Foncesa, Prof. Ever Neyra, James Guerrero, among others.

Michino Farmhouse 
The hamlet of darling is one of the strongest in terms of production refers to `bring bread is so is that caters to the entire district with vegetables and tubers sold in the district on Sundays.

It also has drinking water, with a church of noble material sombolo the religiosity of its people, what is observed in the hospitality of the people that live hamlet lcaserio population is kept in a standard number does not increase or decrease in or progressive alarming because there was a great migration of the young toward the coast, showing when you come back after twenty years to visit the farmhouse is darling with the same people who studied primary and some other young but no new people can be said to be the new generation, is that all new citizens are going to cities such as Lima, Chiclayo, Jaen, Trujillo, Chimbote is migration for economic improvement is alarming, leaving the farmhouse depopulated.

References